Adelfino Mancinelli (born 2 February 1908) was an Italian weightlifter. He competed in the men's heavyweight event at the 1952 Summer Olympics.

References

1908 births
Year of death missing
Italian male weightlifters
Olympic weightlifters of Italy
Weightlifters at the 1952 Summer Olympics
Sportspeople from Rome